Jason Kelby Sello is an American chemist who is a professor of chemistry at Brown University. His research looks to develop antibacterial agents and technologies for bioenergy. In 2020, he was named by Cell Press as one of 1000 inspiring Black scientists in America.

Early life and education 
Sello earned his bachelor's degree in biology at Morehouse College. He was an ARCS Foundation scholar at Morehouse. He moved to Harvard University in 1997 to start his doctoral research, where he concentrated on organic synthesis in the laboratory of Stuart Schreiber. After graduating, he joined Christopher T. Walsh at the Harvard Medical School. Together they worked on enzymology, the study of biological catalysts. He also worked as a postdoctoral researcher at the John Innes Centre, where he investigated the genetics of streptomyces  with Mark Buttner.

Research and career 
Sello combines chemistry, biochemistry and genetics to better understand biological phenomena. He looks to use this information to develop new therapeutic strategies for neurological conditions. He started his independent career as an assistant professor at Brown University in 2006 and was promoted to associate professor in 2012. In 2013 he was made a Martin Luther King Jr. visiting associate professor at the Massachusetts Institute of Technology. At MIT, he worked with Robert T. Sauer on antibacterial agents that can impede protein turnover in bacteria.

Sello has developed antibacterial drugs based on cyclic acyldepsipeptides. These cyclic acyldepsipeptides are produced by different species of bacteria in soil and used to defend against competing bacteria. They target the caseinolytic protease proteolytic subunit (ClpP), which was not possible with any drugs on the market at the time, and may serve as a treatment for tuberculosis.

Sello delivered the inaugural National Organization for the Professional Advancement of Black Chemists and Chemical Engineers (NOBCChE) lecture at the University of Pennsylvania in 2014.  In 2017 he received support from the Chan Zuckerberg Initiative, and was appointed to their Board of Directors. In 2019, Sello delivered the Lloyd Noel Ferguson lecture at California State University. The lecture series honours Lloyd Noel Ferguson, an educator and researcher who established the first doctoral program in chemistry at historically black colleges and universities whilst a professor at Howard University. Sello was named by Cell Press as one of 1000 inspirational Black scientists in America in 2020.

Selected publications

References 

Harvard University alumni
Morehouse College alumni
Brown University faculty
Howard University faculty
Massachusetts Institute of Technology faculty
American chemists
Living people
Year of birth missing (living people)